The Comanchero Motorcycle Club is an outlaw motorcycle gang in Australia and South East Asia. The Comancheros are participants in the United Motorcycle Council of NSW, which convened a conference in 2009 to address legislation aimed against the "bikie" clubs, their poor public image in the wake of several violent clashes and ongoing biker wars, and defusing deadly feuds such as the Comancheros' battles with the Hells Angels. The sincerity of these efforts to defend the battered image of the clubs has been met with skepticism.

History
William George "Jock" Ross, a Scottish immigrant, formed the club in Sydney, New South Wales, in 1968. He chose the name after seeing the 1961 John Wayne film The Comancheros. (There was already a Californian motorcycle club of the same name, first mentioned in a 1965 article by Hunter S. Thompson, and in his book Hell's Angels a year later.) Ross hung a sign on the wall of the Comancheros' clubhouse that read: "If it's white, sniff it/If it's female or it moves, fuck it/If it narks-kill it".

Ross-who gave himself the grandiose title of "Supreme Commander"-ran his club in extremely authoritarian and militaristic manner. The Comancheros were considered to be the most violent of Australia's many outlaw biker clubs in the 1970s-1980s owing to their frequent brawls. Ross required his men to engage in weekly para-military drills and he formed an elite force which he called the Strike Force of especially tough members. Many Comancheros disliked Ross as one former member told the media: "If I wanted to march around in the fuckin' backyard, I would had joined the fuckin' army".    

In late 1982 a second Comanchero chapter was formed by Anthony Mark "Snoddy" Spencer, who had broken away from the first chapter after challenging Ross' authority. When visiting the United States with Charles Paul "Charlie" Scibberas, another member of the second chapter, Spencer met with members of the Texan motorcycle club the Bandidos and the two gangs became allies. At the time, P2P, one of the chemicals necessary for manufacture of amphetamines', were legal in Australia, but not in the United States.. The Bandidos wanted an alliance to have P2P smuggled into the United States to assist with manufacturing amphetamines, the market for which they dominated in Texas. The Bandidos eventually patched-over the second Comanchero chapter to become the Bandidos' first Australian chapter in November 1983.

The Comancheros and Bandidos were now rivals, and in September 1984 the two clubs engaged in the Milperra massacre, a shoot-out that left seven people dead – four Comancheros, two Bandidos, and a 14-year-old bystander. Ross received a lifetime jail sentence for his involvement in the gunfight, but served only five years and three months before he was released.

The Comancheros and Hells Angels clashed at Terminal 3 of Sydney Airport on 22 March 2009 in a brawl involving 10 people in the two rival bikie gangs. The brawl left Anthony Zervas, the brother of a Hells Angel, dead. The fighting was witnessed by over 50 travellers, CCTV cameras and airport staff, including airport security, who could do little to intervene. The security staff were unarmed and Australian Federal Police arrived late. Six Comancheros were arrested as a result of the altercation and convicted of "riot and affray". In November 2011 Comancheros leader Mahmoud "Mick" Hawi was found guilty of affray and murder, but in May 2014 the murder conviction was overturned on appeal and a retrial ordered. Hawi pleaded guilty to manslaughter and in March 2015 he was sentenced to a minimum of 3.5 years jail. In February 2018 Hawi was shot dead, at age 37, whilst sitting in his car outside a gym in Rockdale, NSW.

In late 2009 Duax Ngakuru was elected as national president. Four years later Mick Murray was elected.

The Comancheros expanded to New Zealand in 2018.

Perth chapter
The Comancheros established a single Western Australian chapter in 2010 which is located on Wellman Street, Northbridge, at the Fitness and Fight Centre.

The Comanchero expansion into Western Australia was delayed by the 2010 arrest of Steve Milenkovski who was about to be patched as the Perth's Chapter president when he was arrested in the culmination of Operation Baystone. Operation Baystone resulted in Milenkovski, Yavuz Ozan, Hao Bi, and Mark Vick Kitos being charged with various drug offences. The operation seized 7.5 kilograms of methylamphetamine brought to Western Australia from New South Wales.

In August 2012 Milenkovski was found guilty of two counts of Possess a Prohibited Drug with Intent to Sell or Supply after a 9-week Perth District Court trial and sentenced to 17 years jail as the "king pin".  Two of his co-accused, were convicted of one charge each of attempted possession including David Tanevski who was sentenced to eight years' jail. Hao Bi, who was alleged to have been the courier was acquitted.

In May 2014 eight men including two patched members of the Comanchero were charged for allegedly extorting businesses in Northbridge.

Other chapters

Popular criminal Vince Focarelli was kicked out of the Hells Angels. He then joined other clubs including the Comancheros, and set up his own club. He left the Comancheros later. Him and his son Giovanni were shot at by unknown assailants in 2012. Vince was sent to the Royal Adelaide Hospital and his son died. He has refused to name any suspects even though this was not the first time he was targeted. While Vince was in hospital, he was visited by friends who are Finks members. Some Finks members also visited the funeral of Giovanni.

Infighting
On 5 September 2012, Comanchero member Faalau Pisu was murdered, being shot in the head outside the Serbian National Defence Council at Canley Vale, New South Wales whilst attending a wedding.  A 25-year-old gang member and a 27-year-old associate of the club were also shot and injured. NSW Police allege that an internal rift within the Comancheros was behind recent shootings involving Comanchero members.

It was later revealed by authorities and media that the Comancheros were at conflict with the Rock Machine Motorcycle Club, who had been partially responsible for the infighting. Members of Rock Machine chapters in New South Wales had reported links to a Serbian organized crime group and used that influence to patch over members of the Comanchero Motorcycle Club in mid 2012, causing tension with existing Sydney Comancheros. One of those Rock Machine members to patch over, Faalau Pisu, would be shot dead at a wedding in south-west Sydney on November 5. Two days later, the Rock Machine Sydney chapter retaliated against the Comancheros for the murder of Pisu. Comancheros member, John Devine, was shot six times at a construction site in Rhodes. Devine was the cousin of Comancheros leader, Mark Buddle. Australian authorities also reported tensions between the Rock Machine chapter in Maroubra and the Comancheros in Milperra. The situation would resolve itself, with Mark Buddle, being forced to flee Australia due to a litany of charges against him for unrelated matters.

See also

List of outlaw motorcycle clubs
Criminal Law (Criminal Organisations Disruption) Amendment Act 2013

Books

References

1965 establishments in Australia
Organizations established in 1965
Outlaw motorcycle clubs
Organisations based in Sydney
Gangs in Australia
Motorcycle clubs in Australia
Organised crime in Sydney